Highway 367 is a highway in the Canadian province of Saskatchewan. It runs from Highway 42 near Eyebrow to Highway 19 near Bridgeford.

Highway 367 also connects with Highway 627. At that intersection is the community of Tugaske.

References

367